Ezekiel Holmes (August 21, 1801 – February 9, 1865) was an American agriculturalist and politician known as the "father of Maine agriculture". Holmes secured the establishment of the University of Maine as an independent institution located in Orono, Maine.

Holmes served four consecutive single-year terms in the Maine House of Representatives from 1836 to 1840. He served two single year terms in the Maine Senate in 1844 and 1845 before returning to the House for two terms in 1851 and 1852. He was the nominee of the Liberty Party for governor in 1853 and 1854. He lost to Whig William G. Crosby both times.

Holmes was born in Kingston, Massachusetts in 1801 and graduated from Brown University in 1821 and Bowdoin College's medical school in 1824. He died in Winthrop, Maine in 1865.

References

Further reading
 Ezekiel Holmes: Father of Maine Agriculture by Clarence A. Day, University of Maine Press

1801 births
1865 deaths
People from Kingston, Massachusetts
People from Winthrop, Maine
Farmers from Maine
University of Maine people
Maine Libertyites
Members of the Maine House of Representatives
Maine state senators
Brown University alumni
Bowdoin College alumni